A dandy is a man who places particular importance upon his physical appearance.

Dandy may also refer to:

People
 Dandy (surname)
 Dandy (nickname)
 Dandy Nichols (1907–1986), English actress born Daisy Sander
 El Dandy, ring name of Mexican professional wrestler Roberto Gutiérrez Frías (born 1962)
 James Edgar Dandy, British botanist (1903-1976)

Entertainment
 Dandy (EP), by Herman's Hermits
 "Dandy" (song), a song by The Kinks which was also performed by Herman's Hermits
 The Dandy, British children's comic
 Dandy (video game) for the Atari 8-bit family
 El Dandy (TV series), a Mexican television series

Places
 Dandy, Virginia, United States, an unincorporated community
 Dandy Lake, Idaho, United States
 Common nickname for Dandenong, Victoria, Australia, a suburb of Melbourne

Other uses
 C.D. Dandy, a Honduran football club from 1982 to 1984
 Dandy (mascot), a former mascot of the New York Yankees
 Dandy Dam, Pakistan
 Dandy loom, a cotton loom
 Dandy (paddle steamer), built in England in 1823
 Dandy rig, a British term for a sailing rig, similar to a yawl
 HB-Flugtechnik Dandy, an Austrian ultralight aircraft 
 Dandie Fashions, sometimes called Dandy Fashions, a 1960s London boutique
 Tomica Dandy, a series of model cars by Takara Tomy
 Dandy, one of three animated advertising mascots of Golden Crisp breakfast cereal

See also
 The Dandys, a British indie-pop act formed in 1996
 Dande, a municipality in Bengo Province in Angola
 Dandi (disambiguation)
 Dendy (disambiguation)
 Vincent d'Indy